Positive control may refer to:

 Positive control group in scientific experiments
 Positive control, the air traffic control practice of controlling aircraft whose positions are determined by direct radar observation
 Positive control in dog handling: affirmative physical or non-physical control of a dog (as in using proper leash handling technique or having successfully trained a dog with vocal commands by operant conditioning).